Elżbieta Więcławska-Sauk (born 14 November 1947 in Łódź) is a Polish politician, member of Law and Justice party. She was elected to Sejm on 25 September 2005.

References

Law and Justice politicians
Living people
1947 births
Politicians from Łódź